MS Nordlys is a Norwegian-registered cruise ship operated by Hurtigruten. She was built by Volkswerft GmbH in Stralsund, Germany in 1994. The ship caught fire in September 2011 while sailing off Ålesund, Norway.

Description

The gross tonnage of the Nordlys is 11,204, net tonnage 4,153 and deadweight tonnage 850 tonnes. The ship has capacity for 691 passengers in 482 berths and her cargo deck can accommodate 50 cars. She is served by a crew of 55.

On board the electricity is produced by two BMV KRG-8 auxiliary diesel generators and two shaft generators coupled to the reduction gearboxes. For maneuvering at ports the ship has two Brunvoll bow thrusters.

History

Nordlys was built by Volkswerft GmbH, Stralsund, Germany. She was yard number 102.

Nordlys was launched on 13 August 1993. She is allocated IMO number 9048914 and her port of registry is Tromsø. She was delivered to Troms Fylkes Dampskibsselskap AS on 16 March 1994. She sailed to Copenhagen, Denmark for viewing and then on to Hamburg, Germany. On 22 March, she was christened in Oslo, Norway before sailing to Stavanger and across the North Sea to Newcastle upon Tyne and London, United Kingdom. She entered service with Hurtigruten on the Bergen – Kirkenes route on 4 April 1994.

In November 2008, MS Nordlys was taken out of service and laid up at Åndalsnes.  She returned to commercial service in 2009.

2011 fire

On 15 September 2011 a fire in the engine room killed two people. Twelve people were injured, two of them sustaining serious injuries. Nordlys was off Ålesund, Norway at the time of the accident. All 207 passengers were taken off the ship, which was listing heavily to the port side. But some of the 55 crew remained on board to assist with fire-fighting operations.

References

External links 
Hurtigruten ASA Official homepage - MS Nordlys
 Hurtigruten-Web.com
Mike Bent's Hurtigruten-pages - MS Nordlys

1993 ships
Passenger ships of Norway
Ships built in Germany
Merchant ships of Norway
Hurtigruten
Maritime incidents in 2011
Ship fires
September 2011 events in Europe